The Calva is a right tributary of the river Vișa in Romania. It discharges into the Vișa in Șeica Mare.

References

Rivers of Romania
Rivers of Sibiu County